John Nathan Henderson (born January 9, 1979), nicknamed "Big John" or "Big Hen", is a former football defensive tackle who played ten seasons in the National Football League (NFL). He played college football for the University of Tennessee and was a two-time consensus All-American. The Jacksonville Jaguars chose him in the first round of the 2002 NFL Draft, and he was selected for the Pro Bowl twice.

Early years
Henderson was born in Nashville, Tennessee. He attended Pearl-Cohn Comprehensive High School in Nashville, where he played defensive tackle and tight end for the Pearl Cohn Firebirds high school football team. His teams won back-to-back state championships during his junior and senior years. He was named All-State as a junior when he had 145 tackles and 15 sacks, along with 37 catches for 470 yards and 9 touchdowns. As a senior, he finished with 150 tackles and 32 sacks, to go with 45 catches for 560 yards and 11 touchdowns. He was also selected as a High School All-American by Parade magazine, USA Today, Blue Chip Illustrated, National Recruiting Advisor, and Super Prep. He was ranked as the 7th best high school player in The Sporting News Top 100 and was ranked 1st in the state of Tennessee by the Knoxville News Sentinel and the Chattanooga Times Free Press. Henderson also was named All-State in basketball.

College career
While attending the University of Tennessee in Knoxville, Henderson played for coach Phillip Fulmer's Tennessee Volunteers football team from 1998 to 2001. At Tennessee, he lined up at left defensive tackle next to Albert Haynesworth. He played in the 1999 Fiesta Bowl, 2000 Cotton Bowl Classic, and 2001 Citrus Bowl. As a sophomore, Henderson recorded 43 tackles and four sacks in seven starts. As a junior, Henderson recorded 71 tackles (21 for a loss) and 12 sacks. He won the Outland Trophy as college football's top interior lineman and was recognized as a consensus first-team All-American in 2000, having received first-team honors from the Associated Press, Football Writers Association of America, The Sporting News, Football News, CNN/SI, and Rivals.com. After finishing with 48 tackles (nine for a loss) and 4.5 sacks in 10 starts, Henderson was again recognized as a consensus first-team All-American as a senior in 2001. He finished his college career with 165 tackles (130 solo and 39 for loss) and 20.5 sacks (5th in school history), seven pass deflections, four forced fumbles, and five fumble recoveries.

Professional career

Jacksonville Jaguars
Henderson was the Jacksonville Jaguars' first-round pick (9th overall) in the 2002 NFL Draft. He finished his rookie season with 53 tackles (44 solo), 6.5 sacks, 6 pass deflections, and 1 forced fumble in 16 games (13 starts). In 2003, he had 56 tackles (45 solo and 13 for loss), 3.5 sacks, 7 pass deflections, 3 forced fumbles, and 33 quarterback pressures in 16 starts. In 2004, he finished with 75 tackles (62 solo and 5 for loss), 5.5 sacks, 4 pass deflections, 1 fumble recovery, and 39 QB pressures in 16 starts and was selected to his first Pro Bowl. In 2005, Henderson had 70 tackles (52 solo and 4 for loss), 3 sacks, 7 pass deflections, 3 forced fumbles, and 20 QB pressures in 16 games (15 starts). He also started in the Jaguars' lone playoff game and recorded 5 tackles and 1 sack. On March 21, 2006, Henderson signed a new 6 year, $34 million contract extension with the Jaguars through 2011. The contract also contains $13.4 million guaranteed. Henderson responded with 51 tackles (38 solo and 6 for loss), 3.5 sacks, 6 pass deflections, and 7 QB pressures, as well as his 2nd Pro Bowl selection. He was also named an AP 2nd Team All-Pro. He was filmed by the NFL Network getting pumped up for a game by having a team trainer slap him in the face. In 2007, Henderson finished with 38 tackles (28 solo), 2 sacks, 3 pass deflections, 1 forced fumble, and 13 QB pressures in 15 starts, marking the first time in his career he did not play all 16 games. Henderson started both playoff games for the Jaguars, finishing with 9 tackles and 2 sacks. In March 2008, Henderson's good friend and fellow defensive tackle Marcus Stroud was traded to the Buffalo Bills. Henderson finished the 2008 season with 44 tackles (34 solo), 2 sacks, and 2 pass deflections in 14 games. In the 2009 off-season, Jaguars head coach Jack Del Rio was critical of Henderson for pulling out of OTAs, claiming he was faking a shoulder injury to avoid having to participate. Although many believed Henderson would be released, he met privately with Del Rio and claimed that he had "bought in". Henderson finished the 2009 season with 36 tackles (26 solo), 3 sacks, 3 pass deflections, and 2 forced fumbles.

Henderson was released by the Jaguars on April 26, 2010.

Oakland Raiders
On June 11, 2010, Henderson signed a one-year contract with the Oakland Raiders. On February 24, 2011, he signed a two-year, $8 million contract with the Raiders. Following the 2011 season, he was released on March 14, 2012.

NFL statistics

Personal life
Henderson met his wife Aleviar while attending the University of Tennessee in 2001. They were married on March 10, 2007. Together they have six children: Ja’ Mari, Anaiya, Talia, Ayden, Asa, and Ari Henderson. Their daughter Talia was born with cerebral palsy and epilepsy, and died at age 7 in 2011. In Talia's honor, the Hendersons have made a commitment to help improve the quality of life of other children with disabilities through their nonprofit organization Luvthekidz.

The Hendersons have owned and operated several businesses in the US. In 2007, Henderson opened a clothing store in Jacksonville called "4 Big Men by Big Hen" that sold big and tall clothing. In 2011 the Hendersons opened Aleviar's VIP Lounge and Jazz Bar in Jacksonville, as well as Coast2Coast Trucking in Los Angeles. In 2012, Henderson opened a multiple restaurant locations in Jacksonville called "Big John's Crumpy's Wings & Things"; the restaurant closed in 2015.

References

External links
 NFL.com player profile
 Tennessee Volunteers player profile

1979 births
Living people
All-American college football players
American Conference Pro Bowl players
American football defensive tackles
Jacksonville Jaguars players
Oakland Raiders players
Players of American football from Nashville, Tennessee
Tennessee Volunteers football players